Sendégué is a village and seat of the commune of Ouroubé Douddé in the Cercle of Mopti in the Mopti Region of southern-central Mali.

References

Populated places in Mopti Region